Topsy and Bunker: The Cat Killers is a 1992 mystery/drama film released by Top Bunk Films, the first feature film directed by underground cine-video artist Thomas Massengale.

Synopsis
Topsy (Steve Gunderson) and Bunker (Paul Robertson), two outcasts living in a run-down, fleabag hotel in pre-Giuliani New York. Ensconced in their Manhattan neighborhood, where the present seemingly is out of sync with the overarching, socially defined reality of The City at large, the two misfits pass the time of their times in a fugue. Weaving fantasies of ever more complicated deviousness, they are shocked when, one night, one of their mind games goes horribly wrong and results in the death of Grace (Shirley Stoler), one of the locals.

Cast
Quentin Crisp as Pat the Doorman
Steve Gunderson as Topsy 
Kathy Najimy as Marge 
Paul Robertson as Bunker 
Shirley Stoler as Grace

External links
 
Cast picture 

1992 films
American avant-garde and experimental films
American independent films
1990s mystery drama films
American mystery drama films
1990s avant-garde and experimental films
1992 independent films
1992 drama films
1990s English-language films
1990s American films